Luke James Hallett (born 9 October 2002) is an English footballer who plays as a defender for  club Forest Green Rovers.

Career
Born in Southampton, Hallett progressed through the youth academy at Forest Green Rovers, and made his first-team debut as a substitute in a 3–0 defeat to Stevenage on 2 March 2021. In May 2021, he signed a professional contract for the 2021–22 season.

In August 2021, Hallett joined Southern League Premier Division South club Gosport Borough on loan. On 9 January 2022, his loan was extended until the end of the season. He scored 6 goals in 37 matches in all competitions.

Career statistics

References

Living people
2002 births
English footballers
Footballers from Southampton
Association football defenders
Forest Green Rovers F.C. players
Gosport Borough F.C. players
English Football League players
Southern Football League players